The Hazfi Cup 2006–07 is the 20th staging of Iran's football knockout competition.

1/16 Finals

1/8 Finals

Quarterfinals

Semifinals

Final 

|}

First Leg

Second Leg

See also
 2006–07 Persian Gulf Cup
 2006–07 Azadegan League
 2006–07 Iran Football's 2nd Division
 2006–07 Iran Football's 3rd Division
 2007 Hazfi Cup Final
 Iranian Super Cup

2006
2006–07 domestic association football cups
Haz